Titești is a commune located in Vâlcea County, Muntenia, Romania. It is composed of three villages: Bratovești, Cucoiu, and Titești. These were part of Perișani Commune until 2002, when they were split off to form a separate commune.

Natives
 Ileana Vulpescu

References

Communes in Vâlcea County
Localities in Muntenia